Hygroryza (watergrass) is a genus of Asian plants in the grass family.

Species
The only known species is Hygroryza aristata, (Asian watergrass) native to China (Fujian, Guangdong, Hainan, Taiwan, Yunnan), Bangladesh, Cambodia, India (Maharashtra, Karnataka, Assam, etc.), Laos, Malaysia, Myanmar, Nepal, Pakistan, Sri Lanka, Thailand, Vietnam.

formerly included
Hygroryza ciliata - Leersia hexandra

References

Oryzoideae
Grasses of China
Flora of Taiwan
Flora of Indo-China
Flora of the Indian subcontinent
Monotypic Poaceae genera
Taxa named by Christian Gottfried Daniel Nees von Esenbeck